Norman Tyrell Banks, MBE (12 October 1905 – 15 September 1985) was a radio broadcaster of Australian Rules football in Melbourne for over 50 years from the 1930s. Banks, a noted charity worker, is also famous as the founder of the annual Carols by Candlelight. In later years, he was known for his strongly conservative viewpoint on Talkback Radio.

Early life 
Banks was born at Sandringham, Victoria on 12 October 1905.

Banks studied for nine years for the Anglican priesthood, first at St Aidan's Theological College, Ballarat, and then at Ridley College, Melbourne.

At age 24, he decided he could not proceed as a priest, and went to work as a car salesman and married Lorna May Gilmore. He then had four children: John, Beverley, Felicity and Rodney.

Banks had an interest in public speaking, drama and the creative arts, and the emerging medium of radio soon provided an ideal opportunity to display those interests.

Radio career: 3KZ 
Norman Banks started at 3KZ (now 3KKZ or Gold 104.3 FM) on a salary of four pounds a week in December 1930, but within a month his instant success had seen his wages rise to eight pounds a week. Over the next 20 years, Banks was a leading figure in broadcasting in Melbourne, initiating programs such as Voice of the Voyager, Voice of the People, Voice of the Business Girl, Voice of the Shopper, Husbands and Wives, Junior Information, Spelling Bee, Victoree Varieties, Myer Musicale plus "OBs" (outside broadcasts) of football, tennis, athletics, swimming and other events.

Although not the first to broadcast VFL football (Melbourne's 3AR was broadcasting ex-Carlton player Rod McGregor's descriptions of play at least as early as 1927), Banks was certainly a pioneer of football radio broadcasts, often overcoming extraordinary working conditions. At Princes Park, Carlton in 1931 he broadcast his first football match standing on a ladder at the end of the dressing room. On another occasion at Princes Park, he had the luxury of broadcasting from a hardwood plank protruding from a ladies'' toilet, with no protection from the weather. At Lakeside Oval he broadcast from an 18-meter steel tower.

One of Banks' notable broadcasts was on VE Day 1945 to celebrate the end of World War II. Banks broadcast continuously from the Manchester Unity building, opposite the Melbourne Town Hall at the corner of Swanston and Collins Streets.

Carols by Candlelight 
On Christmas Eve 1937 Banks saw a woman listening to carols alone by the light of a candle. The image prompted him to try to organize a community event to overcome what to many people was a lonely time of the year. With much effort, Banks overcame skeptics and difficulties to stage the first Carols by Candlelight in 1938. On that first night, 10,000 people gathered at midnight in the Alexandra Gardens to sing carols with a 30-strong choir, two soloists, and the Metropolitan Fire Brigade Band.

Since then the event has grown dramatically to become a tradition the world over and is often a fundraiser for charitable purposes. In Melbourne, it is a fundraiser for Vision Australia.

Move to 3AW 
Banks applied to 3KZ management in 1952 to be allowed leave to attend the
Helsinki Olympics. Banks told the station boss that if he was not allowed to go then he would resign. His resignation was accepted on the spot.

Within a matter of days he had signed with the rival station 3AW at about double the salary he was getting at 3KZ—what was described as a "five-figure sum". And he was allowed to go to the Helsinki Olympic Games (indeed he published his notes as The world in my diary; from Melbourne to Helsinki for the Olympic Games in 1953).

At 3AW he covered the Olympics, football, current affairs, outside broadcasts around Melbourne and in-studio programs as well. He became effectively the station's News Editor for a time. He was an agile broadcaster, with a fast-thinking brain to boot. He worked at 3AW until 1978, a 26-year career.

Although Barry Jones was actually the first to talk to people live on air in Australia, Banks pioneered talkback radio in 1960.

Banks became well known on radio in the 1960s and 1970s for his strongly conservative viewpoint, including a strident defense of apartheid in South Africa, and the monarchy. These views were often played out on air in debate with the radical journalist Claudia Wright or the broadcaster Ormsby Wilkins, who called him "a sanctimonious old hypocrite". Furthermore, despite his moral conservatism and appeal to the traditional Anglo middle class, his own personal relationships were subject to press speculation. Nevertheless, he had a very large radio following.

An accident at the football, followed by another in the 3AW corridors, severely reduced his vision (bringing to an end his legendary football descriptions); his vision was so impaired that he qualified for the Australian Government's free of income and assets test Blind Pension. His final on-air words were "the humble people, the little people . . . for your trust, loyalty and support".

Honours 
Banks was made an MBE for his services to broadcasting.

He was inducted to the Melbourne Cricket Ground's Rogues Gallery in 1998, with his citation reading—
An original football caller with 3KZ in 1931, he later moved to 3AW, combining sport and current affairs. (He) Called football for three decades. (He) Covered Helsinki and Melbourne Olympics.

In 1996 Banks was an inaugural inductee into the Australian Football Hall of Fame in the Media category. His citation read—
A pioneer of football broadcasts on 3AW and 3KZ. In 1931, (he) broadcast his first match from Princes Park standing on a ladder at the end of the dressing rooms. (His) Broadcasting career spanned 60 years.

References 

 
 Melbourne Observer – Wednesday, 22 June 2005 accessed 25 February 2007.
 Australian Football Hall of Fame

1905 births
1985 deaths
Radio personalities from Melbourne
Members of the Order of the British Empire
3AW presenters
Australian rules football commentators
Australian Football Hall of Fame inductees
Alumni of St Aidan's Theological College, Ballarat
Alumni of Ridley College, Melbourne
People from Sandringham, Victoria